Tom Ethington (born April 6, 1980 in Glenview, Illinois) is a former lacrosse player for the Denver Outlaws of Major League Lacrosse, who got him in the 2011 MLL Supplemental Draft, and the Colorado Mammoth in the National Lacrosse League.  He played college lacrosse at the University of Denver. He was named in the initial Team USA squad for the 2007 World Indoor Lacrosse Championship. He retired from the MLL after being waived in 2011.

Statistics

NLL
Reference:

References

1980 births
Living people
American lacrosse players
Colorado Mammoth players
People from Glenview, Illinois
Sportspeople from Illinois
University of Denver alumni